Biagio is an Italian male given name. It may also refer to:

People
 Biagio (archbishop), Archbishop of Torres
 Biagio Antonacci, Italian singer-songwriter
 Biagio Betti, Italian painter
 Biagio Black, American painter
 Biagio Brugi, Italian jurist
 Biagio Ciotto, American politician
 Biagio d'Antonio, Italian painter
 Biagio Falcieri, Italian painter
 Biagio Marin, Italian poet
 Biagio Marini, Italian violinist
Biagio Messina, American filmmaker and TV producer
 Biagio Pelligra, Italian actor
 Biagio Pupini, Italian painter
 Biagio Rebecca, Italian painter
 Biagio Rossetti, Italian architect
 Luigi Di Biagio, Italian soccer player
 Saint Blaise, known in Italy as San Biagio
 Vlaho Getaldić, Croatian writer also known as Biagio Ghetaldi

Places
 Monte San Biagio, Italian town
 San Biagio, Venice, church in Venice, Italy
 San Biagio della Cima, Italian village
 San Biagio di Callalta, Italian town
 San Biagio Platani, Italian village
 San Biagio Saracinisco, Italian village

Italian masculine given names